Terre des hommes or Terre des Hommes (literally: land of men, or land of people) may refer to:
 Terre des hommes (English title Wind, Sand and Stars), a 1939 philosophical memoir by French writer and aviator Antoine de Saint-Exupéry
 Terre des hommes, a charitable international humanitarian organization based in Lausanne, Geneva and Basel
 Terre des Hommes, the central theme of the 1967 international exposition in Montreal, Canada, Expo 67
 Terre des Hommes, an annual seasonal fair held for several years in Montreal, Canada after the conclusion of the Expo 67 international World's Fair
 Terre des hommes (album), an album by Mitsou